The 2008 Independence Bowl marked the thirty-third edition of the college football bowl game, and was played at Independence Stadium in Shreveport, Louisiana.

Game summary
The game was contested starting on Sunday, December 28, 2008, with a 7:15 PM CST kickoff, telecast on ESPN. the contest pitted the 2008 Louisiana Tech Bulldogs football team against the 2008 Northern Illinois Huskies football team. Both Louisiana Tech and Northern Illinois were chosen because both of the contracted conferences – the Big 12 Conference and the Southeastern Conference – failed to produce enough bowl eligible teams as both had a pair of schools in the 2009 Bowl Championship Series. Prior to the game, citing financial difficulties stemming from the financial crisis of 2007–2008, PetroSun pulled out as title sponsor.

Both participants were football-only members of the Big West Conference in the mid-1990s. This was the 7th football game between Louisiana Tech and Northern Illinois and the first since 1996. Tech now holds a 6–1 edge over Northern Illinois.

The game was Louisiana Tech's 4th appearance in the Independence Bowl and the first appearance since 1990 when Tech tied Maryland 34–34. The Bulldogs now hold an overall record of 2–1–1 in the Independence Bowl. The victory over Northern Illinois marked the first bowl game victory by the Bulldogs since their 1977 Independence Bowl victory over Louisville.

This was Northern Illinois' 1st appearance in the Independence Bowl and the 4th overall appearance in Division I FBS Bowl Games. Their previous appearances in bowl games include the 1983 California Bowl (20–13 victory over Cal State-Fullerton), 2004 Silicon Valley Classic (34–21 victory over Troy), and 2006 Poinsettia Bowl (37–7 loss to TCU).

Scoring summary

Statistics

References

External links
 Independence Bowl Guide

Independence Bowl
Independence Bowl
Louisiana Tech Bulldogs football bowl games
Northern Illinois Huskies football bowl games
Independence Bowl
December 2008 sports events in the United States